Carl Linde may refer to:

 Carl von Linde (1842–1934), German scientist, engineer, and businessman
 Carl L. Linde (1864–1945), German-American architect
 Carl Linde (football manager) (1890–1952), Swedish football player, manager, administrator and journalist